VVIP, formerly known as VIP (Vision In Progress) is a Ghanaian Hiplife  music group made up of Zeal, formerly known as Lazzy (Abdul Hamid Ibrahim), Prodigal (Joseph Nana Ofori) and Reggie Rockstone (Reginald Ossei) from Nima a suburb in Accra, Ghana

Formation
The founder of this group is actually Friction (Musah Haruna) who formed this group with a friend of his who later had to leave the group for the U.S. to finish his education. So Friction proposed the idea to four people (Promzy, Lazzy, Prodigal, Bone-later left the group) and before they knew it, the five of them were performing at ghetto parties, clubs, street festivals etc.

Friction's dog, Chicago, was also an official member of the group. You could hear the dog growling at the end of their tracks from the late 1990s. Eventually Chicago died.

Albums

In 1997, VIP presented at a street carnival. It was then that a Ghanaian television-presenter, Blakofe (aka Akua Manfo) and a radio-presenter called Michael Smith discovered the group. Blakofe became their manager, and Michael Smith gave them a contract by the name, Precise Music. In 1998, they released their first album, Bibi Baa O, they were famous all over Accra. They became the most popular Hiplife group in Ghana. In 2000, they released their second album, Ye De Aba, which was more successful than their first album. After the second album, Friction felt that it was his time to work as an individual artist and quit the group. The group now had three members (Promzy, Prodigal and Lazzy) and released a third album in 2001 called Lumbe Lumbe Lumbe with the smashing hit "Daben na Odo Beba". However the hip life group conquered the Ghana music charts with their 2003 album Ahomka Womu; their single also named "Ahomka Womu" was number one on the Ghanaian charts for over 20 weeks. VIP won five awards at the Ghana Music Awards from the hit single and the group gained international exposure after this success. Since then, the group has been touring worldwide. They are now among the most famous artists in Ghana. Promzy then later left the group to work as a solo artist but according to him he says he did not break out of the group

Following the exit of Promzy, Reggie Rockstone, known as the godfather of Ghanaian rap who back in the mid-1990s christened the new genre Hiplife, joined the group. The new group's name metamorphosed to VVIP and they have since produced smash singles like "Selfie", "Skolom" and "Dogoyaro".

Documentary
VIP have launched their 110-minute documentary, Home Grown:Hiplife in Ghana; produced and directed by the American independent filmmaker, Eli Jacobs-Fantauzzi. Some artists present at the launching were Reggie Rockstone, Hashim, Tinny, Sidney, Tic Tac, Mzbel, Rab Bakari, Faze of Nigeria and other artists from Africa and the Caribbean. And to celebrate the release of Home Grown, BDNP (Boogie Down Nima Productions) is set to travel a worldwide release tour of the film in several countries including Brazil, UK, India, South Africa, Nigeria, Canada, Italy, Norway, Jamaica, and the United States.

Awards 

|-
|rowspan="1"|1997
|vip
| Best Album Cover - African Hip Hop.Com(Europe)
|
|-
|-
|rowspan="1"|2004
|vip
|Hip-life Song Of The Year - Ahomka Wo Mu (Ghana Music Awards)
|
|-

|-
|rowspan="1"|2004
|vip
| Hip-life Album Of The Year - Ahomka Wo Mu (Ghana Music Awards)
|
|-

|-
|rowspan="1"|2004
|vip
|Song Of The Year - Ahomka Wo Mu (Ghana Music Awards)
|
|-

|-
|rowspan="1"|2004 
|vip
|2004- Artiste Of The Year (Ghana Music Awards)
|
|-

|-
|rowspan="1"|2004 
|vip
| Hip-life Artiste Of The Year (Ghana Music Awards)
|
|-
|-
|rowspan="1"|2004
|vip 
|2004- Best album of the year - Ghana Music Awards (UK)
|
|-
|-
|rowspan="1"|2005
|vip
|  Best African Group -Channel O (South Africa)
|
|-
|-
|rowspan="1"|2005
|vip
|Most Popular Artiste of the Year (Nigeria Music Awards)
|
|-

|-
|rowspan="1"|2005
|vip
| - Youth Excellency Awards (Ghana)
|
|-

|-
|rowspan="1"|2006
|vip
|Achievement Award for community service (Ghana)
| 
|-

|-

|rowspan="1"|2010
|vip
|Best group video -4syte Music Awards (Ghana)
|
|-

|-
|rowspan="1"|2010 
|vip
| Best hiplife video -4syte Music Awards (Ghana)
|
|-
|-
|rowspan="1"|2010
|vip 
|Artiste of the year at the City People Awards (Nigeria)
|
|-
|-
|rowspan="1"|2011 
|vip
| 2011-Best hiplife Artiste of the year – Ghana Music Awards
|
|-
|-
|rowspan="1"|2012 
|vvip
| Best choreography of the year 4syte Music Awards (Ghana)
|
|-

|-
|rowspan="1"|2014
|vvip
| Best choreography of the year 4syte Music Awards (Ghana)
|
|-

|-
|rowspan="1"|2014
|VVIP
|Best collaboration choreography of the year 4syte Music Awards (Ghana)
|
|-

|-
|rowspan="1"|2014 
|vvip
|Best collaboration choreography of the year Ghana Music Awards (Ghana)
|
|-

|-
|rowspan="1"|2015
|vvip
|Best group of the year (Ghana Music Awards)
|
|-
|-
|rowspan="1"|2015
|vvip 
|Best group of year (GEA)
|
|-
|-
|rowspan="1"|2016
|vvip
| Best group of the year (AFRIMA - All Africa Music Awards)
|
|-
|-
|rowspan="1"|2016
|vvip
|Best group video of the year (AFRIMA - All Africa Music Awards)
|

Notable concerts
2003- "Hip-Life Explosion" Tour (London, Amsterdam, Sweden, Denhaag)
 2004- Back Stars (GH National Football team) Fundraiser show for the OlympicGames in Athens (Greece)
 2004- "Peace and Reconciliation Concerts" organized by the United Nations and Liberian Government.
 2005- "Thank you" concerts were also organized by United Nations and the Government of Sierra Leone
2006- "Hip-Life Invasion" Tour (The USA from New York to Los Angeles) 
2008–present Home Grown Hiplife Documentary Tour World

References

Ghanaian musical groups
The Headies winners